The South African Railways Class 18 2-10-2 of 1927 was a steam locomotive.

In December 1927 and January 1928 the South African Railways placed two Class 18 three-cylinder steam locomotives with a 2-10-2 Santa Fe type wheel arrangement in service on the Witbank-Germiston coal line.

Manufacturer

The Class 18 2-10-2 Santa Fe type steam locomotive was designed by Colonel F.R. Collins DSO, Chief Mechanical Engineer (CME) of the South African Railways (SAR) from 1922 to 1929, and built by Henschel and Son in Germany. Two locomotives were delivered in 1927 and 1928, numbered 1360 and 1361.

Characteristics
They were very powerful three-cylinder locomotives. At the time, three-cylindered locomotives were being built in appreciable numbers in Europe and America. Factors in their favour were their more even turning moment, improved balancing and better distribution of crank-pin thrust. Drawbacks were increased complexity and higher repair cost.

When delivered, the third cylinder was clearly visible, but plating was subsequently added beneath the smokebox and hid it from view.

Contemporary Henschel publicity appropriately referred to them as the "Henschel Giants". They were larger in most respects than Deutsche Reichsbahn's new Standard gauge Class 44 three-cylinder 2-10-0 locomotives. Although their all-up locomotive weight was almost the same, when considering the fact that the SAR's Cape gauge Class 18 had shorter axles and frame stretchers, saving weight that could then be built into other items such as the firebox, the Class 18 was the larger locomotive.

The Class 18 had a round-topped firebox with a combustion chamber and with arch tubes supporting the brick arch.

To allow the locomotive to negotiate curves of  radius despite its long coupled wheelbase, the third and fourth pairs of driving wheels were flangeless. In addition, the locomotive made use of a Krauss-Helmholtz bogie system, where the leading pair of driving wheels has a limited amount of sideplay with an articulated link to the leading bissel bogie. The bissel bogie was connected to a sleeve around the first driving axle so that any displacement of the bissel bogie in one direction would cause a similar displacement of the leading driving axle in the opposite direction, thereby steering the driving wheels through curves.

The outside cylinders drove the third pair of driving wheels while the inside cylinder drove the second pair through a cranked axle, with the cylinder mounted in an inclined position. The three cranks were arranged at an angle of 120 degrees to each other, allowing for the inclination of the inner cylinder.

Service
The Class 18 was introduced in an attempt to ease problems which were being experienced with increasingly heavy coal trains on the line between Witbank and Germiston, where the Class MF Mallets were considered as being too sluggish and the hauling capacity of the non-articulated fleet was being stretched to the limit.

In service, the locomotives disappointed. In spite of the two sets of flangeless coupled wheels and the Krauss-Helmholtz system, the Class 18 experienced excessive flange and tyre wear while the Chief Civil Engineer claimed increased rail wear. The cylinder design was outdated and along with the lightweight motion and rods, contributed to them being uneconomical high-maintenance machines. The complicated valve gear was not robust enough and frequently gave trouble owing to wear and breakage. The result was that the locomotives had to be shopped at under .

Both Class 18 locomotives were withdrawn by 1951. After their locomotives were withdrawn from service, the two Type HT tenders had their mechanical stokers removed and their drawgear modified for use with Class 15CA locomotives. They were then redesignated Type KT.

Knuckle couplers
In 1927, the SAR began to convert the couplers of its Cape Gauge rolling stock from the Johnston link-and-pin coupling system which had been in use since the establishment of the Cape Government Railways in 1873, to AAR knuckle couplers. Judging from contemporary photographs as well as the official SAR Locomotive Diagram Book and the dimensional locomotive drawings as published by Holland, which were for the most part based on the original as-delivered and unmodified loco­motives, the Class 18 locomotives were delivered new with knuckle couplers fitted, as were the Classes GCA, GF, HF and U which also entered service in 1927.

Conversion of all rolling stock would take several years and both coupler types could still be seen on rolling stock into the late 1950s. During the transition period, knuckle couplers on locomotives had a horizontal gap and a vertical hole in the knuckle itself to accommodate a link and a pin respectively. This enabled them to couple to vehicles which were still equipped with the older Johnston couplers.

Knuckle couplers had first been used in South Africa more than two decades earlier. The Central South African Railways (CSAR) introduced Gould knuckle couplers on the rolling stock of its Limited Express and Imperial Mail passenger trains in 1904. The Limited Express operated between Pretoria and Johannesburg while the Imperial Mail operated between Pretoria and Cape Town. These knuckle-couplers also had split knuckles to accommodate coupling to the old Johnston couplers with a link and pin, since the CSAR retained the old couplers on all their locomotives to keep them compatible with their own goods and older passenger rolling stock as well as with that from the other railways it connected with.

Illustration

References

1970
1970
2-10-2 locomotives
Henschel locomotives
Cape gauge railway locomotives
Railway locomotives introduced in 1927
1927 in South Africa
Scrapped locomotives